Bafut may refer to several things relating to Cameroon:

 Bafut language
 Bafut Subdivision
 Bafut, Cameroon, the headquarters town of the subdivision
 Bafut Wars, a series of early 20th-century wars
 Fon of Bafut the local ruler